

Charles Zwolsman Jr. (born June 15, 1979, in Lelystad, Netherlands) is a race car driver who formerly competed in the Champ Car World Series.  He is the son of former sports car racing driver Charles Zwolsman Sr., who competed in the late 1980s and early 1990s.

Zwolsman started racing go karts before competing in Formula Ford, Formula Renault and Formula 3 in Europe. He finished 16th and 17th during his two seasons in the Formula 3 Euro Series before moving his career to the United States.

In 2005 Zwolsman made his debut in the Toyota Atlantic series with Condor Motorsports. The unknown driver made an impression quickly; he was fastest in qualifying in the first race at Long Beach. However, his car failed the technical inspection and he was forced to start last.  During the race, he moved up steadily to finish third. Zwolsman went on to win three races that season and clinch the championship over rivals Tõnis Kasemets and Katherine Legge. The newly crowned Atlantic champion made his Champ Car debut in the season finale in Mexico City for Team Australia.

In 2006 he competed in a full season of the Champ Car series with Mi-Jack Conquest Racing, finishing 13th in the season standings with two seventh-place finishes as his best results. He did not return in 2007, and has not competed in American open wheel racing since. In 2009 Zwolsman is driving for the Kolles LMP1 team in the Le Mans Series where he is currently placed 9th in the LMP1 driver standings. The team also ran the 2009 24 Hours of Le Mans, where they placed 7th overall despite team driver Narain Karthikeyan not being able to compete due to a non-racing related injury just prior to the start.

In 2011, Zwolsman Jr. was charged in the Netherlands with involvement in money laundering. According to the prosecutors, Zwolsman jr. has financed his racing career with the proceeds of the criminal activities of his father. The prosecution has asked for a 240-hour community service sentence, a 15-month suspended prison sentence and a 20,000 euro fine. Zwolsman jr. has denied all charges.

Zwolsman jr. proceeded to fight these allegations and after some major investors/sponsors where acquitted in 2013 Zwolsman himself was also cleared of all charges in 2016

Motorsports career results

Complete Formula 3 Euro Series results
(key)

American open–wheel racing results
(key)

Atlantic Championship

Champ Car

Complete 24 Hours of Le Mans results

References

External links
 
 

Living people
1979 births
People from Lelystad
Dutch racing drivers
24 Hours of Le Mans drivers
Champ Car drivers
Atlantic Championship drivers
German Formula Renault 2.0 drivers
French Formula Renault 2.0 drivers
Formula Renault Eurocup drivers
European Le Mans Series drivers
Sportspeople from Flevoland
Manor Motorsport drivers
Kolles Racing drivers
Conquest Racing drivers
German Formula Three Championship drivers